Medora is a genus of gastropods belonging to the family Clausiliidae.

The species of this genus are found in South Europe and Mediterranean.

Species:

Medora adensameri 
Medora agnata 
Medora almissana 
Medora armata 
Medora contracta 
Medora dalmatina 
Medora eris 
Medora garganensis 
Medora hiltrudae 
Medora italiana 
Medora lesinensis 
Medora macascarensis 
Medora milettiana 
Medora pollinensis 
Medora proxima 
Medora punctulata 
Medora stenostoma

References

Clausiliidae